Albania and Iran have no diplomatic relations after Albania severed them in September 2022. Albania's alignment with the United States and their decision to allow the People's Mojahedin Organization of Iran to take refuge in the country had already strained relations between the two countries. Tensions came to a head when Albania suspended diplomatic ties, accusing Iran of an alleged major cyber attack.

History

Pahlavi Iran and Communist Albania 
Due to distance between the two countries, it was unclear when the two countries first established relations, though it is highly likely the relations began following the World War II, when Albania became a communist state and Iran was under the Pahlavi dynasty. As Albania was a communist state, it aligned with the Soviet Union while Pahlavi Iran allied with the United States throughout the early phase of Cold War.

Islamic Theocratical Iran and Communist Albania 
Following the establishment of Islamic theocracy in Iran at 1979, Albania, being a communist state, aligned with the Soviets against Iran in the Iran–Iraq War.

Kosovo War 
At first, Iran sought to gain support from Albanians by fighting in the Kosovo War, and there were reports about Iranian fighters in Kosovo, as well as Iranian media openly spread news about Albanians thanking Iranian support and desire for a similar theocratic state, similar to the tactics with which Iran gained successful support from the Bosniaks in the previous Bosnian War. Iranian President Mohammad Khatami had strongly opposed the NATO bombing of Yugoslavia in 1999 and condemned NATO harshly.

As for the result of Albania's alignment with the United States, poor relations between Iran and Albania started to bear the pressure. In 2002, Iran founded the "Koran Foundation of Kosovo" with hope to drive Albanians in both Albania and Kosovo to abandon its secularism and support a Shi'a theocracy, but it was unsuccessful; Albanian police even launched crackdowns on the foundation. Since 2008 Iran has refused to recognize the independence of Kosovo.

Increased tensions 
Albania's decision to welcome People's Mujahedin of Iran (MEK) taking refuge in the country led to further deterioration of Albanian–Iranian relations. 
According to Al Jazeera, the exiled MEK has constructed a center at its Albanian headquarters where 1,000 to 1,500 "online soldiers" are taught to spread hashtags in support of overthrowing the Islamic Republic.
In 2021, Facebook company removed hundreds of fake accounts which were associated MEK troll farm based in Albania. The company said that it deleted more than 300 accounts from a network associated with Mujahedeen-e-Khalq (MEK)
The group denied the existence of an Albanian troll farm connected to the MEK.
Albanian President Ilir Meta dismissed the Iranian claim, and condemned the Iranian government.

Albania accused Iran of plotting terrorist attacks in the country during the 2018 FIFA World Cup qualification, and expelled Iranian diplomats in response, including the Iranian ambassador. Iran, in response, accused Albania of fabrication under American and Israeli pressure. 

In January 2020, following the death of Iranian general Qasem Soleimani, Iranian Supreme Leader Ali Khamenei and Iranian President Hassan Rouhani made speeches smearing "a small and sinister country" for trying to overthrow the Islamic regime in Iran, which was believed to be directed at Albania due to MEK's refugee status. 
Albanian Prime Minister Edi Rama openly endorsed an attack against Iran by the U.S. in response to Iranian criticism against Albania.

Cyberattack and severed ties 

On 15 July 2022 Albania suffered a serious cyberattack, which temporarily shut down numerous Albanian government digital services and websites. The Albanian government advised the purpose of the attack was to in a bid to "destroy it, paralyse public services and hack data and electronic communications from the government systems", but ultimately the attack failed.

The attack was identified by cybersecurity firm Mandiant as having been conducted by agents that had previously acted on behalf of Iran. Iran publicly denied responsibility of the attacks, framing the attacks as "anti-Iranian" and alleging that "third parties" had maligned Iran through creating allegations of Iranian hacking. The Albanian government has responded by announcing that they are working with Microsoft and the FBI in an investigation into the cyberattack.

On 7 September 2022, Albanian Prime Minister Edi Rama announced Albania would sever relations with the Islamic Republic of Iran in response to a cyberattack conducted by Iran against the Albanian state. All embassy staff, including diplomatic and security personnel, were ordered to leave Albania within 24 hours, in note delivered to the Iranian embassy in Tirana.

The United States soon after declared that they will take "further action" in response to the attack on a NATO ally.

Shirin Nariman, an Iranian-American supporter of the National Council of Resistance of Iran, previously designated as a terrorist group by the United States, praised Albania's actions and expressed a wish that more countries would follow suit.

See also 

 Foreign relations of Albania
 Foreign relations of Iran

References 

 
Iran
Bilateral relations of Iran